John Francis Holecek (born May 7, 1972) is a former professional American football player and nationally recognized football coach. He played linebacker for eight seasons in the NFL for the Buffalo Bills, the San Diego Chargers, and the Atlanta Falcons. He went to college at University of Illinois at Urbana-Champaign and played with perhaps the best college linebacker corps every assembled. Despite knee injuries lowering high draft expectations and ending Butkus Award speculation, Holecek finished his Illini career with over 430 tackles. Holecek was drafted by the Buffalo Bills in 1995, played for the San Diego Chargers in 2001, and for the Atlanta Falcons in 2002. Holecek played in the NFL for 8 seasons and was credited for over 560 career tackles and winning NFL Player of the Week honors.

He returned to the Chicago area and was the head football coach for 17 years at Loyola Academy - who won the 2015, 2018, and 2022 Class 8A Illinois Football State Championships. Holecek was a finalist for the 2015 National Coach of the Year award. His often nationally-ranked Loyola teams had played internationally and hosted a ESPN High School Kickoff game in 2022. Coach Holecek announced his Loyola Academy retirement in December 2022 (with a cumulative 185-36 record), planning to focus "on the next chapter of his career”.

Marian Catholic career 

Holecek was a three-sport athlete at  Marian Catholic High School in Chicago Heights, Illinois, excelling in wrestling, baseball, and football.  Holecek was selected to a Chicago all-star baseball team that toured Europe his junior summer, but he decided to play football after receiving multiple Big Ten and division one scholarship offers.

Holecek played both tight end and middle linebacker for Marian coach Dave Mattio.  Coach Mattio reflected on Holecek in a 2001 Times newspaper interview, "Most people don't know he was a good catcher and could have been a great wrestler," Mattio said. "Even then, I saw how he never quit and everything had to be perfect. He was a tough kid, I compare him to street kid because of his toughness and being hard-nosed on the field. He played hard and the thing about John, he could run for a big guy".

Holecek finished his high school career with 243 tackles, 13 sacks, two fumble recoveries, three interceptions, two punts blocked, 16 receptions and 2 TD passes.   Holecek was All-State and named the “Defensive Player of the Year” his senior year by a metro newspaper.

Holecek had his NFL jersey number 52 retired by his alma mater in 2000.  Other retired Marian jerseys include Mike Prior and high school and one-season NFL teammate Rodney Harrison (San Diego Chargers).

Illinois career

After graduation from Marian Catholic High School (Illinois), John played for the Illinois Fighting Illini football team from 1990 to 1994. Holecek was the Illini's co-Defensive Player of the Year in his  red-shirt freshman season.  Holecek made the All-Big in 1993 and 1994 teams, and was also a team captain. Holecek suffered multiple ACL injuries during his Illinois career, dampening prior Butkus Award consideration.

Holecek was part of the linebacker foursome that gave Illinois the nickname "Linebacker U" in the 1990s. The Foursome also featured All-American and first-round, second and third overall draft picks, Simeon Rice and Kevin Hardy, as well as, Butkus award winner Dana Howard.

Illinois led the nation in total defense for most of Holecek's senior season.   Illinois participated in college bowl games each of Holecek's seasons.

Holecek is fifth on the Illinois career tackles list with 436 (above another Chicago area Illinois linebacker great Dick Butkus) and was twice named honorable mention All-America.  Holecek graduated as a finance major (on the Dean's list) with some credits towards his master's degree.  Holecek's arm-wrestling match with his childhood hero, legendary Walter Payton, was stated to be one of his greatest college football-related moments.

Lou Tepper, former Illinois coach and author of "Complete Linebacking" described John's aggressive linebacker playing style as "a natural presser" and called John "a fiery leader and competitor".  Tepper praised Holecek in a college pre-season magazine, stating "He will bite, chew, and claw his way to make the play.  He has incredible toughness and intelligence, and that is rare combination."

"I remember Holecek was named the Big Ten Defensive Player of the Week" (November 1993 comeback win vs Minnesota) Tepper said of the least heralded of his all-star linebacker corps. "We had two future Butkus Award winners (Howard and Hardy) and Simeon Rice, who was just as good or better than two others I coached — Khalil Mack and Bruce Smith. And yet, you could make an argument that if you could just pick one guy to start your defensive with, it would be Holecek, just because of the effect he had on others."

NFL career

Holecek was drafted in 1995 by the Buffalo Bills in the fifth round if the NFL draft (144th pick) of the 1995 draft. Holecek was drafted by Pro Football Hall of Fame coach Marv Levy.  Holecek also played for NFL coach Wade Phillips.

Holecek had hoped to be drafted by his hometown Chicago Bears, and had discussions with the new head coach Dave Wannstedt.  The Bears instead drafted Sean Harris from Arizona, who had a brief NFL tenure.

Holecek reported to the perennial Super Bowl bound Bills rookie camp in April 1995. He played six seasons with the Bills, averaging over 14 starts his last three seasons. Holecek flourished as an inside linebacker in Phillips' defensive 3-4 system.  He also briefly played middle linebacker in a 4-3 alignment when injuries caused Coach Phillips to switch defenses mid-season.  John emerged as a defensive stalwart and on-field coach for the Bills, notching an incredible 414 tackles from 1998 to 2000 and became known for his technique and football acumen.

Holecek started eight games over the course of his first three seasons with the Bills (1995-1998). After playing in only one game his rookie season due to injury, Holecek was ready to be a regular contributor to the team in 1996 before another knee injury suffered in the first preseason game forced him to spend the entire year on injured reserve.  Holecek also pursued completion of his MBA degree these seasons.  In 1997 Holecek provided the first glimpse of his promising future as he recorded 86 combined tackles in eight starts (14 appearances).  Head coach Marv Levy stated decades later that Holecek was one of his favorite NFL players to coach.

In 1998 Holecek led the Bills with 133 tackles in his first season as a full-time starter and was named the team's recipient of the Ed Block Courage Award.  Holecek was credited with a career game high of 21 tackles during game film review of the Miami Dolphins Wild Card playoff game.  That season the Bills improved to the fifth-rated run defense in the NFL—up from 15th the year before.

In 1999 Holecek tallied 116 combined tackles, including 63 unassisted, to go along with one sack, one interception, six passes defensed and two forced fumbles. Holecek's remarkable season also included a career-best 22-tackle outing in a Wild Card Playoff game played at Tennessee.

His finest campaign came in 2000 when he started all 16 games and had a career-high 165 combined tackles. He also intercepted one pass and deflected four others.

In his seventh season, Holecek was released very late in training camp in salary cap move by a new Bills head coach and GM. Holecek was quickly signed by the San Diego Chargers. The Bills who ranked 3rd in total defense in the league in 2000, finished 3-13 without Holecek and others in 2001.  John played in San Diego for one partial season; he finished the last five games of the season on injured reserve as a knee problems limited him to just 11 injury-riddled appearances.

Holecek then signed with the Atlanta Falcons in his 8th season (2002). Holecek was reunited with Falcon defensive coordinator Wade Phillips, who tutored Holecek for six seasons while serving as defensive coordinator or head coach of the Buffalo Bills.   Holecek started the first 11 games for the play-off bound Falcons and was the team's second leading tackler before breaking his upper wrist/forearm.  Holecek seriously re-injured his right arm in the last game fo the regular season and the resulting wrist surgery was career ending.

NFL career statistics

Loyola Academy coaching career 
After retiring from the NFL, Holecek returned to Illinois to work in finance and assist coaching high school football at St. Ignatius in Chicago.
At the insistence of Nick Rassas (NFL safety, Notre Dame All-American, and Loyola Academy graduate) Holecek applied for the head coach position at Loyola Academy, a private college preparatory in Wilmette, Illinois. NFL coaches Marv Levy and Wade Phillips called the school's AD Pat Mahoney on Holecek's behalf. Mahoney remembered “You could see that he was a teacher of the game... He was smart and driven. He wasn't going to do anything half-heartedly.”

Since taking the reins in 2006, Holecek's teams have been to the playoffs every year, which includes sixteen IHSA State Playoff appearances (the exception being the COVID-19 impacted 2020-21 year, where there were no state playoffs held), and led Loyola to four consecutive State Final games from 2015 through 2018.

Holecek's teams have won at least 11 games for the last nine consecutive years (as of 2018).  Loyola plays in the Chicago Catholic League Blue division. Loyola has won outright or shared six of the last eight CCLB conference titles (as of 2018).  Holecek's career coaching record is 146–30 with an 83% overall winning percentage; including over 91% of games in the last four full seasons (2015-2018).  Holecek's Ramblers are 18–2 in the state playoffs over the last four years, winning two State Championships.

In 2008, he coached Loyola to a Prep Bowl Championship at Soldier Field as the L.A. Ramblers defeated Lane Tech, 17–0.

The 2009 team played in the state semi-finals. The 2010 team was the start of Holecek's run on Chicago Catholic League Blue championships.

In 2011, he coached the Ramblers to a second-place finish in the Class 8A State Championship, losing to Bolingbrook High School 21–17 in inclement weather. This was only the school's third appearance in the state championship game and the first in 18 years.

In August 2012, Holecek brought his Ramblers to Dublin, Ireland to play Jesuit Dallas in Global Ireland Football Tournament 2012, featuring Notre Dame vs Navy as the main draw.  That same year John Holecek joined Dick Butkus in making an instructional video one of one Butkus's websites to emphasize tackling with proper form to reduce the risk of head injury.  Loyola was a state semi-finalist in 2012.

Loyola was the 8A state championship runner-up in 2013, after losing to Naperville Central 13–10 in the title game.

In April 2014, Holecek's coaching mentor Marv Levy visited Loyola as part of the NFL "Heart of a Hall of Famer" program. Levy's lessons were laced with words like “perseverance”, “work ethic”, and “preparation”, hallmarks of Holecek's playing career and coaching tenure at Loyola.

Loyola Academy won the Chicago Prep Bowl 14-7 over Chicago Curie at Soldier Field on November 28, 2014. Playing on the road with their third-string QB, LA had previously lost a close state playoff game against the eventual state champions.

In late September 2015, John Holecek notched his 100th coaching victory—becoming the first Illinois high school football coach to reach 100 wins in so short of a career span (9 1/2 seasons). At the close of the regular season in October 2015, Loyola ranked number 1 in the state of Illinois in all major football polls after completing a 9-0 undefeated regular season, by way of a 34-point average margin of victory (24-point lowest margin of victory). Holecek told the Chicago Tribune, "We haven't thrown one ball in the fourth quarter".  Loyola won the 2015 Chicago Catholic League Blue conference title after a 49–21 victory over defending 7A State Champion Mt. Carmel.

In November 2015, Loyola won their first four playoff games to go to 13–0, including a dominating (early third quarter running clock) victory over the defending 8A champion Stevenson 49–0, a come-from-behind victory over Homewood Flossmor (who was rated #1 in the state for the first eight weeks of the season) in a televised game attended by over 6,000 fans, and a close semi-final victory over Palatine in the snow.  Loyola Academy ranked in the top 20 nationally by Maxpreps Experts, Freeman, and USA Today and number 6 nationally in the USA Today Super 25 Computer Rankings. On November 28, 2015, Loyola played Marist for the state title and utilized an aggressive defensive scheme with many blitz packages.  LA defeated Marist 41–0 (with a running clock imposed) to win the IHSA class 8A State Championship, extending its season record to 14–0.  For the 2015 season LA outscored its opponents 558–123, won nine games by 30 points or more, and had six shut-outs.

Loyola finished the regular 2016 season 9-0 as the Ramblers (#1 ranked team in Illinois) defeated #2 ranked Mount Carmel early in the season and #3 ranked Brother Rice to close the season (both games were on the road).  Loyola players were paid a visit by NFL legend Marv Levy prior to the beginning the 2016 8A IHSA playoffs (#1 seed). At the end of October, Holecek's Ramblers ranked #5 nationally (USA Today Super 25 Computer Rankings) and had a 26-game win streak, plus had a 24-game home field winning streak that dates back to 2012. LA finished as runner-up in 2016 in class 8A.

Loyola finished the regular season at 8–1 in 2017 and the Ramblers’ won their third consecutive undefeated and outright Catholic Blue League title in a row (with Holecek again receiving Coach of the Year awards). LA's home win streak stood at 29 games (including a victory against perennial Californian powerhouse Bishop Amat) as the playoffs began. In early Nov 2017, Holecek became the school's all-time coaching leader with 133 wins - including the last ten in a row and 31 consecutive victories at home.</https://www.journal-topics.com/articles/ramblers-brush-aside-red-devils/>

In November 2018, Loyola Academy beat their first three playoff opponents, including two shutouts, and qualified for their ninth IHSA 8A semifinals in the last ten years. Loyola went on to beat Brother Rice 13–3 in the 8A final game on November 24, 2018. Underdogs Loyola beat the 14th, 6th (10-1 Maine South), 3rd (undefeated Oswego), 2nd (12-0 and reigning 8a champion Lincoln Way East)  and 1st seeds (13-0 Brother Rice) during their playoff run. Holecek said. “They fulfilled something I will always remember, one of the most special seasons of my life. Nothing is going to beat this in my career."

According to the NFL's PlayFootball (in April, 2021), "Holecek has become one of the top high school football coaches in the country".

As of November 19, 2021 Loyola has won 11-plus games 12 times and had a 20 game winning streak in 2021 (including 6-0 in the Covid delayed 2020 that season that was postponed until the 2021 Spring). The 2021 spring team was reported be Loyola's best team as evidences by its 30 point margin of victory over many top ranked teams include #2 Mt Carmel (and three other top 10 teams). Loyola was the overwhelming favorite, likely gaining Holecek a third championship in five years, however the governor/IHSA decided to cancel the playoffs. Holecek's coaching record then stood at 172-34 (83%) with 69 playoff victories.

Loyola won the 8A championship 13-3 over unbeaten Lincoln Way East at Illinois' Memorial Stadium in November 2022.

Holecek's LA coaching career concluded with him having Loyola's all-time win record and the highest winning percentage (84%) amongst active Illinois high school coaches. His other accomplishments include: 186 wins, including 2 undefeated seasons and a 30-game winning streak, 9 Chicago Catholic Championships, 17 consecutive playoff appearances with 10 Final Fours, 7 State Finals, and 3 Championships.

Loyola Resignation  

In early December 2022, Holecek announced that he would be leaving Loyola at the end of the school year (when the last of his three sons would graduate).

Loyola AD Genevieve Atwood commented on Holecek's career, "to see the amount of work and dedication and attention to detail and the way he works with young people is an amazing thing.  It’s never been about him. I couldn’t be prouder of the work he’s done here".

She remarked, "How do you write a better script than that: a third championship and to win on the field he played on in college?”

Awards

University of Illinois, Bruce Capel Award as the team's "Most Courageous Player" in 1994.

NFL Ed Block Courage Award in 1998.  Award presented to a player who personifies courage, strength, leadership and pursuit of excellence.

NFL Defensive Player of the Week, for a stellar Monday Night Football game vs the Miami Dolphins in October 1999.  Holecek first registered a jarring sack on Dan Marino that led to Gabe Northern's fumble return for a touchdown, then with Buffalo clinging to a 23–18 lead late, Holecek registered his first career interception.  Facing a three-receiver set, Holecek dropped back in zone defense, and picked off Dan Marino.  Holecek said "obviously, with Dan Marino, it's a special play."

In September 2011, Holecek was inducted into the Chicago Sports Hall-of-Fame.  Holecek received accolades for his grit and determination and for dealing with adversity by successfully rehabbing three major knee injuries.  Other inductees in his class included Jim Calhoun, Bobby Hull, Glenn Doc Rivers, Barry Sanders and former Notre Dame and Pittsburgh Steelers running back Rocky Bleier.

In August 2014, the Butkus Foundation honored Holecek at a Chicago Bears game for his work has a Chicago youth sports leader.

Presented the 'Ray Meyer Coach Award' in 2015 at the Giant Awards — the former Chicago Park District superintendent Ed Kelly's sports program that honors accomplished Chicagoans in various fields.

In January 2016, Holecek was named one of six finalists for the 2016 U.S. Army All-American Bowl National Coach of the Year award. The award honors the nation's top high school football coach for exceptional coaching abilities and leadership skills, as well as acknowledging his role as a positive influence to young Americans on and off the field.

Also that month, LA was honored with the 11th Annual MaxPreps "Tour of Champions" award presented by the Army National Guard. The award honors select state champions who are also national ranked according to MaxPreps national computer rankings.

In November 2018, Holecek was awarded 22nd Century Media's 2018 Football 'Coach of the Year'.

Awarded the USA Today 'Coach of the Year' for the ALL-USA Illinois Football Team in December 2018.

Philanthropy 

Holecek served as the Buffalo Bills spokesman for the Muscular Dystrophy Association.

Holecek was involved in the Western New York Children's Literacy Program "Rush For Reading”.

Holecek's Loyola Academy teams volunteer and visit Misericordia, often playing pick-up games with children and adults with developmental disabilities.  Loyola annually hosts Misericordia at a fall home game.

Holecek's Loyola Academy team participates annually in the Special Olympics Chicago: Polar Plunge

References

External links
 Vision of Greatness
 Loyola Coaching Decision
 Loyola Info
 Fighting Illini
 Monday Night Football Player of the Week
 Chicagoland Sports Hall of Fame
 Professional Statistics
 NFL Profile (note tackle stats not official or accurate in 2000s)
 High School Info
  U of I Where Are They Now
  Favorites to Win
  Holecek on Lovie Smith
 Interest in Joining Illinois Staff
  Loyola vs. Lincoln-Way East Football Preview
  Loyola Completes Shocking Turnaround
  A Perfect Replacement for Lovie Smith
 NFL Legend John Holecek Leads Illinois High School Football Team to Prominence
 Holecek Steps Down
 Loyola Coach Leaves
 Holecek Steps Down

1972 births
Living people
Players of American football from Chicago
American football linebackers
Illinois Fighting Illini football players
Buffalo Bills players
San Diego Chargers players
Atlanta Falcons players
People from Steger, Illinois
Ed Block Courage Award recipients